Tiger Cubs II (literally "flying tigers 2"), alternatively titled Special Duties Unit II, is a 2014 Hong Kong police procedural television drama produced by TVB under executive producer Lam Chi-wah. The serial premiered on Sunday, 19 October 2014 on Jade, HD Jade in Hong Kong, TVBJ in Australia, Singapore and Astro Wah Lai Toi, Astro Wah Lai Toi HD in Malaysia. It stars Joe Ma, Linda Chung, Him Law, Oscar Leung, Mandy Wong, Benjamin Yuen and Christine Kuo as the casts of the second installment. It over the time slot previously occupied by Shades of Life.

It is the sequel to Tiger Cubs, which was aired in the summer of 2012. The series follow a fictional team of elite paramilitary officers from the Special Duties Unit of the Hong Kong police force, a team that specialises in counter-terrorism, hostage rescue, and crimes that are deemed too dangerous for regular police to handle.

Cast

Special Duties Unit (SDU)

Criminal Intelligence Bureau (CIB)

Organized Crime and Triad Bureau (OCTB)

Supporting characters

Episodes

Viewership ratings

Accolades

References

External links
Official Website

TVB dramas
Hong Kong police procedural television series
Hong Kong television series
Hong Kong crime television series
Hong Kong action television series
2014 Hong Kong television series debuts
2014 Hong Kong television series endings
2010s Hong Kong television series
Tiger Cubs (TV series)